Due to the strong historical, political, cultural and religious ties between them, Greece and the United States today enjoy excellent diplomatic relations and consider each other an ally. Today Greece is one of the United States's closest allies.

Diplomatic relations between Greece and the United States were established in the 1830s after the Greek War of Independence. Greece and the United States have long-standing historical, political, and cultural ties based on a common western heritage, and participation as Allies during World War I, World War II, the Cold War and the War on Terror. Relations were tense during the years of Greece's military dictatorship.  The governments of the two countries cooperate closely in the areas of finance, energy, commerce, technology, academics, sciences, judiciary, intelligence and military, as well as through many multilateral organizations such as the Organization for Security and Co-operation in Europe (OSCE), the Organisation for Economic Co-operation and Development (OECD), the North Atlantic Treaty Organization (NATO), and the United Nations; they are both founding members of the latter.

The United States is the largest foreign investor in Greece; direct U.S. foreign investment in Greece was about $4.5 billion in 2006.

Americans are consistently well liked in Greece. 66% of Greeks viewed Americans favorably in 2016. Back in 2005 it were 67%.

Americans have a very positive opinion of Greece as well. 54% of the American people view Greece positively, while only 4% view it negatively, making Greece one of the 25 most liked countries in the US.

History

From 1825 to 1828, the U.S. Navy conducted anti-piracy operations against Greek pirates in the Aegean Sea.

The first draft of the Monroe Doctrine in 1823 included praise of the Greek rebels in their revolt against the Ottoman Empire. American opinion strongly supported Greece. However, Secretary of State John Quincy Adams strongly objected and that passage was dropped. The final text indicated the U.S. government had no intention of interfering in European affairs.  However, as Angelo Repousis shows, private citizens including philanthropists, missionaries, and political activists, inspired by a vision of ancient Greece, were eager to become involved in Greek affairs.

On November 9, 1837, the United States recognized the independence of Greece when the American Minister at London signed a treaty of Commerce and Navigation with the Greek Minister at London. That act marked the first negotiation of the United States with Greece and represented the U.S. recognition of Greece as in the independent country in the early 1800s. The same year, the first American Consul Gregory Anthony Perdicaris took up his position in Athens. The mid-19th-century treaty established the Greek-U.S. relations in part to help liberate and establish Greece as a separate country from the Ottoman Empire.

World Wars

In 1914, on the eve of the First World War, the U.S. Navy sold two war-ready battleships to Greece, the former U.S.S. Idaho and Mississippi, which were renamed the Kilkis and Lemnos.  The ships ensured Greece kept its naval superiority in the Aegean against Turkey, which was threatening to reclaim the islands it had lost during the Balkan Wars.  The sale of the ships was arranged by the Wilson Administration, including then Assistant Secretary of the Navy Franklin D. Roosevelt, with Congressional authorization.

The U.S. was active in providing humanitarian aid to Greece after the devastation it suffered in World War I.

During World War II, the U.S. opposed the British plan to restore King George II of Greece to the throne because he was closely associated with fascism. Instead, the U.S. helped to establish a regency but did not oppose British efforts to defeat the communist insurgents.

The British took a leading role in helping the Greek government fight the insurgency. When its financial crisis forced it to cut back, the British turned that role over to the U.S. in 1947, until the end of the Greek Civil War in 1949.

Truman Doctrine
The U.S. had largely ignored Greece since it was in the British sphere but lent $25 million on easy terms in 1946. However, it complained that its financial system was chaotic. The far left boycotted elections in March 1946 that were held under international supervision. The US judged them fair and supported the new conservative government, just like the plebiscite that brought back King George II. Behind the scenes, American diplomats tried to convince the government to end corruption. Fighting broke out in 1946, with the communist element receiving arms and bases of support across the border in Yugoslavia. London secretly informed Washington in February 1947 that its funding would run out in a matter of weeks. A crisis was at hand, and the U.S. decided to act decisively.

Administration leaders, believed that the Eastern Mediterranean was ripe for an armed communist takeover since Britain had to withdraw its forces and its money from Greece. In the Greek Civil War, communist partisans, who had been organized to fight the Germans, were by 1946 strongly supported by the Tito's Yugoslavia but received no support from the Soviet Union.  If the Communists won, Turkey, with its large but weak and antiquated army, would be at very high risk.

Truman won bipartisan support in March 1947 for the Truman Doctrine, which gave $300 million in military and economic aid to Greece and $100 million to Turkey. They were grants, not loans. Truman declared to Congress on March 12:
It must be the policy of the United States to support free peoples who are resisting attempted subjugation by armed minorities or by outside pressures.

In a larger sense, the Truman Doctrine formalized a policy of Soviet containment in which the United States would oppose the further spread of Communism. The policy meant rejecting any rollback strategy to end communist rule where it already existed.

The United States also contributed hundreds of millions of dollars to rebuild Greece's buildings, agriculture, and industry as part of the Marshall Plan.

Tito's split with Stalin and American aid helped the Greek government and Army to win the war; by 1949, the government forces had won the civil war. Greece joined NATO in 1952.

Postwar
The U.S. provided Greece with more than $11.1 billion in economic and security assistance after 1946. Economic programs were phased out by 1962, but military assistance continued. In the fiscal year 1995, Greece was the fourth-largest recipient of U.S. security assistance, receiving loans totaling $255.15 million in foreign military financing.

In 1953, the first defense cooperation agreement between Greece and the United States was signed, providing for the establishment and operation of American military installations on Greek territory. The current "mutual defense cooperation agreement" provides a continued U.S. military support to Greece and the operation by the U.S. of a major military facility at Souda Bay, Crete.

Relations between the two countries were later strained by the Cyprus dispute and after the end of the Greek military junta, which particularly the Greek left considered to be backed by the U.S. In 1974, Greece temporarily left the military branch of NATO to protest the Turkish invasion of Cyprus. In 1980, it rejoined the military branch and stayed a close US-ally during the Cold War and until now.

Truman statue in Athens
A 12-foot bronze statue of Harry Truman was erected in Athens in 1963, with the help from Greek-Americans. It is one of only eight statues of American presidents outside the United States. The statue has been a focal point of anti-Americanism in Greece. It has been toppled over several times, painted and vandalized. In March 1986, it was destroyed by a dynamite bombing by a group considering it as being a symbol of American imperialism. The statue was restored within a year by the government although it had originally been refused by the Athens City Council. More recently in April 2018, a group of students tried to topple the statue during a communist anti-American protest but were stopped by riot police.

Trade and foreign direct investment

Mainly the Greek products exports to the United States involve  petroleum products, cement, tobacco, fur products, olive oil, marble, clothing articles, steel products, pipes, and refractory products. On the other hand, U.S. imports to Greece mostly are industrial and agricultural products and machinery, telecommunications equipment, computers and electronic equipment, timber, medical and pharmaceutical items, machinery and parts, skins, and wood-pulp. 
Even though the United States imposed restrictions on the importation of certain fresh or processed agricultural products, there is full freedom of sale of Greek industrial products in the whole U.S. market. The EU-United States Agreement signed in May 1993 allows Greek enterprises access to U.S. public contracts. Trade between the two countries amounted to nearly a billion US dollars in 2010. Due to the Credit Crunch Crisis of 2008 that has negatively affected the Greek economy, thousands of U.S. firms have shifted their productive activities from other Balkan countries and Italy to Greece due to lower costs of production.
The Greece-US Economic & Commercial Cooperation Committee (ECCC) is also currently working to bilaterally expand trade flow and cooperation, and widen their market in Southeastern Europe, the Black Sea and the Middle East.

Military collaboration

Bilateral Greek-U.S. military relations can be dated back to the early 19th century when Greeks were fighting for their independence against the Ottoman Empire. During the movement of philhellenism, the two nations found commonality under their values of freedom and democracy, while many American philhellenes went also to help in Greece.

Military collaboration stemming from wars like World War I and World War II have set the foundation for the two countries as firm allies. Greece and the U.S. have also been allies through the Cold War as well as conflicts in Bosnia, Kosovo, and Afghanistan within this past century.

The U.S.-Greek Defense Industrial Cooperation Agreement, which was signed on September 8, 1983, regulates defense and intelligence relations between Greece and the United States. A revised and expanded Defence Cooperation Agreement was signed in 2019, with the aim of enhancing the close defense ties between the two countries. During the Gulf War collaboration strengthened relations between Greece and the United States, as Greece sent military and medical assistance to the U.S. forces in the Gulf region. In May 1995 Greece Defence Ministry organised the "NEW SPIRIT 95" military exercises in the area of Karditsa as a mean to foster military cooperation between Greece, Albania, Romania, Bulgaria and the United States. In parallel, exchange of visits between high-level political and military officials to the two countries such as that of Condoleezza Rice to Athens reinforced cooperation between Greece and the United States in the areas of fighting against terrorism and the war against drugs. Additionally the port of Thessaloniki is open to NATO exercises in the Eastern Mediterranean and Greece has been a main contributor to NATO operations in Afghanistan, including counterterrorism and counter-piracy maritime efforts. Greece and the U.S. are also allies in the War of Terror and are closely cooperating in the coalition for the fight against the Islamic State, with Greece providing technical and arms support to the U.S.-led coalition in its efforts to drive out ISIL from Iraqi and Syrian territories.

The armies of the two countries, the United States Armed Forces and the Hellenic Armed Forces, also participate in large-scale military drills which are taking place in the Mediterranean region, while Crete's naval base at Souda Bay in Greece, serves as the largest and most prominent naval base for the United States in the eastern Mediterranean. Additionally, the Souda Bay base features the only deep water port in the entire Southern European and Mediterranean regions that is suitable and capable for maintaining the largest aircraft carriers, making it of vital importance for the broader security in the region, with the only other such options available for the US Navy being Norfolk in the United States and Dubai in the Persian Gulf. In 2019, the two have signed a revised defense pact, which American officials described as critical to responding to security challenges in the Eastern Mediterranean Sea. The deal provides for increasing joint U.S.-Greece and NATO activity at Larissa, Stefanovikio, and Alexandroupoli as well as infrastructure and other improvements at the Crete Naval Base.

On 6 November 2020, Greece raised an official request to the United States for the acquisition of 18-24 stealth multi-role F-35 fighter jets from the year 2021.

On 13 October 2021, Greece and the US upgraded their defense pact, signing an agreement that allows expanded access for US troops to train and operate from four additional bases in Greece indefinitely. Greece also has a bilateral maritime defense pact with France, and the parties hold these to be complementary to NATO.

Diplomatic representation

Greece is officially represented in the United States through its embassy in Washington, D.C. and consulate generals in the cities of Atlanta, Boston, Chicago, Los Angeles, New Orleans, New York City, Houston, Tampa, and San Francisco. The United States has an embassy in Athens and a consulate general in Thessaloniki. 
Both Greece and the United States share membership in various international organisations with most important being the United Nations, North Atlantic Treaty Organization, Euro-Atlantic Partnership Council, Organization for Security and Cooperation in Europe, Organisation for Economic Co-operation and Development, International Monetary Fund, World Bank, and World Trade Organization. Additionally Greece has been a permanent observer to the Organization of American States.

Greek-American community

The earliest Greek immigrants date back to the 1760s, although the first significant Greek community was not established until the 1850s in New Orleans, LA. The first Greek consulate and Greek Orthodox Church in the US were founded in New Orleans as well. Immigration of Greeks into the US was at its peak in 1945 after damage of the World Wars and Greek Civil War had left their economy in ruins. After admittance of Greece into the EU in 1981, immigration of Greeks into the US greatly decreased. As of 1999 there were 72,000 Greek-Americans who had migrated to Greece, but now those number might be minimal due to the current economic crisis in the EU and Greece.

The 2000 US Census showed 1,153,295 Greeks living in the US. About 3 million Americans are of Greek ancestry. Greek-Americans are an established, well-organized community in the U.S. (several notable politicians, including former Vice-President Spiro Agnew, and Senators Olympia Snowe, Paul Sarbanes and Paul Tsongas are of Greek ancestry as well as 1988 Presidential candidate and former Massachusetts Governor Michael Dukakis), and they help cultivate close political and cultural ties with Greece. There are several political advocacy groups founded by Greek-Americans that seek to bring awareness of ongoing public and economic issues occurring in Greece. The American Hellenic Council has been in service since 1974. The Federation of Hellenic Societies of Greater New York has been in service even longer, since 1938, and likewise seeks to strengthen the Greek-American community in New York by being a voice to the Greek people.

Greek lobby in the United States
A group of Greek American lawyers, lobbyists, public relations firms are working under the American Hellenic Institute to promote the national interests of Greece in the U.S. Congress in cooperation with other national lobbies in the United States, with most important being the Israeli lobby and to a lesser extent the Armenian lobby.

Heads of Governments visits

Embassies 
The Embassy of the United States is located in Athens, Greece The Embassy of Greece is located in Washington, D.C.

See also
 Foreign relations of Greece
 Foreign relations of the United States
 Greek Americans
 Greece lobby in the United States
 US–EU relations

Footnotes

Further reading
 Amen, Michael Mark. American Foreign Policy in Greece 1944/1949 (P. Lang, 1978)
 Coufoudakis, Van. “The United States, the United Nations, and the Greek Question,  1946–1952.” In Greece in the 1940s, edited by John Iatrides, (University Press of New England, 1981) pp 275–97. 
 Couloumbis, Theodore A. Greek political reaction to American and NATO influences (Yale University Press, 1966)
 Couloumbis, Theodore A., and John O. Iatrides, eds. Greek-American relations: a critical review (Pella Publishing Company, 1980)
 Fatouros, A. A. “Building Formal Structures of Penetration: The United States in Greece, 1947–48.” In Greece in the 1940s, edited by John Iatrides, (University Press of New England, 1981) pp 239–58.  
Fields, James. America and the Mediterranean World (Princeton University Press, 1969).
 Georgiou, Leonidas V., Conversations with F.D.R. at his AHEPA Initiation: Frigates, Battleships, Espionage, and a Sentimental Bond with Greece (New York: Knollwood Press, 2019). online
 Goldbloom, Maurice. “United States Policy in Post-War Greece.” In Greece under  Military Rule, edited by Richard Clogg and G. Yannopoulos, (1972) pp 228–54.
 Harris Jr, William D. "Instilling Aggressiveness: US Advisors and Greek Combat Leadership in the Greek Civil War, 1947-1949." Thesis, Army Command and General Staff College (Fort Leavenworth Kansas, 2012). online
 Iatrides, John. “The United States and Greece in the Twentieth Century.” In Greece  in the Twentieth Century, edited by Theodore Kariotis and Fotini Bellou, (2003) pp. 69–110.  
 Iatrides, John. “The United States, Greece, and the Balkans.” In Greece and the New Balkans, edited by Van Coufoudakis, Harry Psomiades, and Andreas  Gerolymatos, (1999) pp. 265–94.
 Klapsis, Antonis.  "From dictatorship to democracy: US-Greek relations at a critical turning point (1974-1975)." Mediterranean Quarterly 22.1 (2011): 61-73 online
 Klarevas, Louis. "Were the eagle and the phoenix birds of a feather? The United States and the Greek coup of 1967." Diplomatic History 30.3 (2006): 471-508. online
 Laipson, Helen. "US Policy towards Greece and Turkey since 1974." in The Greek-Turkish Conflict in the 1990s (Palgrave Macmillan, 1991) pp. 164-182.
 Miller, James Edward. The United States and the Making of Modern Greece: History and Power, 1950-1974 (2009) online
 Nalmpantis, Kyriakos. "Time on the Mountain: The Office of Strategic Services in Axis-Occupied Greece, 1943-1944" PhD dissertation Kent State University, 2010. online
 Pelt, Mogens. Tying Greece to the West: US-West German-Greek Relations 1949-1974 (Museum Tusculanum Press, 2006).
 Ploumis, Michail. "A New Way Forward: Rebalancing the US Security Cooperation with Greece in a Fast Changing Geostrategic Environment." Applied Finance and Accounting 4.1 (2018): 95-111. online
 Repousis, Angelo.  Greek-American Relations from Monroe to Truman.  (Kent State University Press, 2013), a scholarly survey since the 1820s
 Sakkas, John. "The Greek dictatorship, the USA and the Arabs, 1967–1974." Journal of Southern Europe and the Balkans 6.3 (2004): 245-257.
 Stathakis, George. "US Economic Policies in Post Civil War Greece, 1949-1953: Stabilization and Monetary Reform." Journal of European Economic History (1995) 24#2 pp: 375–404.
 Stearns, Monteagle. Entangled allies: US policy toward Greece, Turkey, and Cyprus (Council on Foreign relations, 1992). online
 Wittner, Lawrence. American Intervention in Greece, 1943–1949 (Columbia University Press, 1982).
 Wittner, Lawrence. "American Policy toward Greece, 1944–49." In Greece in the 1940s, edited  by John Iatrides, (University Press of New England, 1981) pp. 229–39.
 Zervakis, Peter A. "The Role of the 'Justice For Greece Committee' for the American Involvement in Greece after World War II," Balkan Studies (1997) 38#1 pp 159–196
 Zervakis, Peter A. "The Greek Diaspora in the United States and American Involvement in Greece after World War II," Modern Greek Studies Yearbook'' (1998), Vol. 14, pp 213–240.

External links
 Greek Ministry of Foreign Affairs about relations with United States
History of Greece - U.S. relations
Stereotyping Greeks as "ethnic hysterics"

 
United States
Greece